Bruin Romkes Comingo ("Mr. Brown") was the first Presbyterian minister ordained in Canada. He arrived in Halifax as a Foreign Protestants during Governor Edward Cornwallis' tenure. He was ordained by Rev. John Seccombe. He served at St. Andrew's Presbyterian Church (Lunenburg), Nova Scotia. (His ordination was preceded by the irregular ordination of John Frost (minister) in Yarmouth County, Nova Scotia.)

References

External links 
 A sermon preached at Halifax, July 3, 1770, at the Ordination of the Rev. Bruin Romeas Comingoe. To the Dutch Calvanistic Presbyterian Congregation at Lunenburg ... Being the first preached in the Province of Nova Scotia, on such an occasion. To which is added an Appendix. 

History of Nova Scotia